Paiwarria is a genus of butterflies in the family Lycaenidae. The species of this genus are found in the Neotropical realm.

Species
Paiwarria antinous (C. & R. Felder, [1865])
Paiwarria aphaca (Hewitson, 1867)
Paiwarria chuchuvia Hall & Willmott, 2005
Paiwarria episcopalis (Fassl, 1912)
Paiwarria telemus (Cramer, [1775])
Paiwarria umbratus (Geyer, 1837)
Paiwarria venulius (Cramer, [1779])

External links

"Paiwarria Kaye, 1904" at Markku Savela's Lepidoptera and Some Other Life Forms

Eumaeini
Lycaenidae of South America
Lycaenidae genera